Aqibullah Khan is a Pakistani politician who was a member of the National Assembly of Pakistan from August 2013 to May 2018. He has also been a member of the Provincial Assembly of Khyber Pakhtunkhwa from October 2018 till January 2023.

Political career

Khan was elected to the National Assembly of Pakistan as a candidate of Pakistan Tehreek-e-Insaf from Constituency NA-13 (Swabi-II) in a by-election held following 2013 Pakistani general election. The seat was fell vacant after his brother Asad Qaiser chose to retain his Provincial Assembly seat that he won in the 2013 general elections.

He was allotted PTI ticket to run in August 2013 by-election despite concerns in the party.

References

Living people
Pakistan Tehreek-e-Insaf politicians
Pashtun people
People from Swabi District
Pakistani MNAs 2013–2018
Year of birth missing (living people)
Place of birth missing (living people)